Bell Aliant High Speed Internet is the residential broadband Internet technology offered by Bell Aliant. It is available in Atlantic Canada.

Features

Bell Aliant High Speed Internet includes a wired modem, wireless internet, and Internet Security service options.

Bell Aliant has two stand-alone unlimited High Speed Internet options: High-Speed, which offers up to 1.5 Mbit/s download and up to 640 kbit/s upload and High-Speed Ultra, which offers up to 7 Mbit/s download and up to 640 kbit/s upload.

In a Bundle (with satellite or IPTV and home phone), Bell Aliant High Speed offers unlimited internet up to 7 Mbit/s download and up to 640 kbit/s upload.

References

Bell Aliant